Heartbreak Radio is a 1981 album by Rita Coolidge and was released on the A&M Records label.

Track listing

Side one
"Walk On In" (Carole King) – 3:24
"One More Heartache" (Bobby Rogers, Smokey Robinson, Marv Tarplin, Ronnie White, Pete Moore) – 3:27
"The Closer You Get" (James P. Pennington, Mark Gray) – 4:28
"Wishin' and Hopin'" (Hal David, Burt Bacharach) – 3:43
"Heartbreak Radio" (Troy Seals, Frankie Miller) – 3:56
"Man and a Woman" (Jerry Piopelle, John Harris) – 3:38

Side two
"I Did My Part" (Naomi Neville) – 4:05
"Hold On (I Feel Our Love Is Changing)" (Will Jennings, Joe Sample) – 4:58
"Basic Lady" (Allen Toussaint) – 3:03
"Stranger To Me Now" (Donna Weiss, Mary Unobsky) – 4:57
"Take It Home" (Wilton Felder, Will Jennings) – 3:17

Personnel
Rita Coolidge – vocals
Waddy Wachtel, Andrew Gold, Dean Parks, Fred Tackett – guitar
Bob Glaub, Kenny Edwards – bass guitar
Michael Utley, Bill Payne – electric piano, organ
Jeff Porcaro, Russ Kunkel, Mike Botts – drums
Nick De Caro – accordion
Jim Horn – saxophone
Gordon Goodwin, Tom Saviano, Bill Green, Bruce Paulson, Jerome Jumonville, James Gordon, Joel Peskin, Lee Thornburg, Steve Madaio – horns
J.D. Souther, Andrew Gold, Brock Walsh, Kenny Edwards, Maureen McDonald, Nicolette Larson, Rosemary Butler – background vocals
Cleopatra Kennedy, Leonard Castro, Margaret Branch, Paulette Brown, Petsye Powell, Sherlie Matthews, Venetta Fields, William Smith – choir on "Hold On (I Feel Our Love Is Changing)" and "Take It Home"

Charts

References

Rita Coolidge albums
1981 albums
Albums arranged by David Campbell (composer)
A&M Records albums
Albums recorded at Sunset Sound Recorders